Sergej Yevgenyevich Maslennikov (born 18 April 1982 in Ufa) is a Russian nordic combined skier who has competed since 2002.

Career
Competing in two Winter Olympics, he earned his best finish of ninth in the 4 x 5 km team event at Turin in 2006 while his best individual finish was tenth in the 15 km individual event at those same games.

Maslennikov's best finish at the FIS Nordic World Ski Championships was tenth twice (4 x 5 km team: 2005, 2009) while his best individual finish was 20th in the 10 km mass start at Liberec in 2009.

His best World Cup finish was tenth twice, both in 2005.

References

 Sports-Reference.com profile

1982 births
Living people
Nordic combined skiers at the 2006 Winter Olympics
Nordic combined skiers at the 2010 Winter Olympics
Olympic Nordic combined skiers of Russia
Sportspeople from Ufa
Russian male Nordic combined skiers